Cakaudrove West may refer to:
 Cakaudrove West (Fijian Communal Constituency, Fiji)
 Cakaudrove West (Open Constituency, Fiji)